Hlava is a Czech surname (meaning "head"), its female form is Hlavová. Notable people with the surname include:

Jakub Hlava (born 1979), Czech ski jumper
Jaroslav Hlava (1855–1924), Czech pathologist
Lukáš Hlava, Czech ski jumper, brother of Jakub

Czech-language surnames